This is a list of public art in Oxfordshire, in England. This list applies only to works of public art accessible in an outdoor public space. For example, this does not include artwork visible inside a museum.

Oxford

Faringdon

Wantage

References

External links 
 Guide to public art in Oxfordshire (PDF) by South Oxfordshire district council
 Public art map (PDF) by Oxford City Council 
 Public art in Headington, Oxford

o
Lists of buildings and structures in Oxfordshire